was the national airline of the Empire of Japan from 1928 to 1938.

History
Commercial aviation began in Japan with the privately held Japan Air Transport Institute, which pioneered passenger service between Sakai, Osaka and Tokushima on Shikoku island on 12 November 1922.  

On 30 October 1928, the Japanese government established the Japan Air Transport Corporation (JAT) as the national flag carrier under the Ministry of Communications. JAT absorbed the Japan Air Transport Institute and two other small companies and began scheduled passenger services in 1929. It initially used the Imperial Japanese Army air base at Tachikawa as its terminal in Tokyo. JAT later moved to Haneda Airport, which was completed in August 1931.

JAT was heavily subsidized by the Japanese government, receiving the equivalent of $1 billion in today's currency prior to the attack on Pearl Harbor. During the early 1930s, its aircraft were often chartered (for free) by the military for missions in Asia, especially during the 1931 invasion of Manchuria. 

This role declined as military transport missions in China were taken over by three new carriers that JAT helped to establish: Manchukuo National Airways in 1932, Huitong Airways in 1936 and China Airways in 1938. These subsidiary companies were joint ventures between JAT and the puppet governments of Manchukuo and the Provisional Government of the Republic of China.

JAT shifted its focus to the civilian passenger market and began using new 14-passenger Douglas DC-2s on new, more commercially profitable routes between Japan and Manchukuo in 1936. With the start of the Second Sino-Japanese War in 1937, JAT benefited from a resurgence in military passenger traffic.

In 1938, JAT carried nearly 70,000 passengers, representing 2.6 percent of the world's passenger traffic.

In December 1938, the government established a new airline, Imperial Japanese Airways, as a monopoly for all civil aviation and Japan Air Transport Corporation was merged into the new company.

Aircraft

Fokker Trimotor (1929-1938)
Fokker Super Universal
Nakajima Super Universal (1929-1938)
Douglas DC-2 (1936-1938)
Nakajima AT-2 (1937-1938)

Accidents and incidents
24 August 1938 Nakajima Super Universal (J-BJDO) collided in mid-air with a Mitsubishi Ki-1 (J-BIDH) over Omori, Tokyo, killing all five on board both aircraft and 55 on the ground.

References

External links

Early Japanese Civil Aviation  at Century of Flight
JAT Timetable, 1929 20th Century Timetable Museum
JAT Passenger Boarding Ticket, 1936 JCAL

Defunct airlines of Japan
Empire of Japan
Airlines established in 1928
Airlines disestablished in 1938
Japanese companies established in 1928
1938 disestablishments in Japan